Clarence J. Bailey (March 7, 1963 - May 29, 2006) was an American football running back who played one season for the Miami Dolphins of the NFL.

Early life
He was born on March 7, 1963, in Milford, Delaware, and attended Milford High School. He played one season of football in high school and had 1411 rushing yards and 17 touchdowns. He was named first-team all-conference and first-team all-state.

College career
He went to college at Wesley College, playing there from 1982 to 1983. He went to Hampton from 1984 to 1986, leading the team in punt returns as a junior and as a senior.

Professional career

1987 Season
Bailey was signed by the Toronto Argonauts in 1987. He was released at roster cuts.

He also played shortly for the Chesapeake Bay Neptunes, a semi-professional team.

He was also signed by the Miami Dolphins during training camp. He was released on August 18. He was later signed as a replacement player. In his first game he had 10 rushes for 55 yards. After his first game he did not have any more statistics. He played three games.

Later life
He had eight children. He died on May 29, 2006, at the age of 43. In 2008 he was inducted into the Milford Football Hall of Fame.

References

Further reading

1963 births
2006 deaths
American football running backs
Miami Dolphins players
Hampton Pirates football players
Wesley Wolverines football players
Players of American football from Delaware
People from Milford, Delaware
National Football League replacement players